Mehdi Cheriet (born April 12, 1987) is a French-Algerian professional basketball player who currently plays for SO Maritime Boulogne of the Nationale Masculine 1 in France.

Collegiate career 
After completing his years at Albert Thomas School in Roanne, France, Cheriet enrolled in Arizona Western College in Yuma, Arizona. He helped the team win their third consecutive JUCO Region I championship and the NJCAA district finals in his freshman season. As a sophomore, Cheriet was known as a premier NJCAA basketball player and was ranked the 17th-best junior college player by Rivals.com. By the end of the season, he garnered All-Arizona Community College Athletic Conference (ACCAC) honors as his team finished with a 26-3 record.

International career 
On July 20, 2015, it was announced that Cheriet would join Algeria for the AfroBasket 2015. He was called up by team head coach Ali Filali despite not being in the preliminary squad.

References

External links 
Mehdi Cheriet at Eurobasket.com
Mehdi Cheriet at RealGM
LNB.fr profile
SDSU bio

1987 births
Living people
People from Tarare
French sportspeople of Algerian descent
Algerian men's basketball players
French men's basketball players
Power forwards (basketball)
Arizona Western Matadors men's basketball players
San Diego State Aztecs men's basketball players
Chorale Roanne Basket players
Sportspeople from Rhône (department)